Dictyophorines are a pair of sesquiterpenes isolated from the fungus Phallus indusiatus (Dictyophora indusiata).  These compounds are based on the eudesmane skeleton, a common structure found in plant-derived flavors and fragrances, and they are the first eudesmane derivatives isolated from fungi. Dictyophorines A and B promote the synthesis of nerve growth factor in astroglial cells.

References

Sesquiterpenes